The 2006 June rugby union tests (also known as the summer tests in the Northern Hemisphere) were rugby union Test matches played during between June in 2006. It saw several tests between touring Northern Hemisphere sides and home Southern Hemisphere sides, including a test series between Australia and England, Argentina and Wales, New Zealand and Ireland and South Africa and Scotland. France played Romania and the Springboks, while Italy played Fiji and Japan. 

Most of the fixtures acted as end-of-season tours of the Northern Hemisphere nations, and pre season matches for the Tri Nations Series and Pacific 5 Nations for the Southern Hemisphere nations.

Overview

Series

Other tours

Fixtures

The scoreline belied the closeness of the contest, as Ireland were 20 minutes away from a first-ever win over the All Blacks, holding a 23–15 lead halfway through the second half.

This was Scotland's largest-ever defeat in South Africa.

 This was Argentina's first-ever Test in Patagonia. Puerto Madryn was the site where the first Welsh colonists arrived in Argentina, leading to the establishment of Y Wladfa in the 1860s.

 Argentina win a Test series against Wales for the first time.

 This was England's fifth consecutive Test defeat, their worst streak since 1984. Australia's George Gregan made his 120th international appearance, setting an all-time record for the sport.

 Fiji claim a Six Nations scalp for the first time since 2000, when they defeated Italy (then newly admitted to the Six Nations), the last time the Azzurri visited Churchill Park.

 Fullback Percy Montgomery became the first Springbok to score 600 Test points.

 South Africa suffered their first defeat at home since 2003. The result meant that the teams switched places in the world rankings, with France overtaking South Africa for second.

See also
Mid-year rugby union test series
2006 end-of-year rugby union tests
2006 IRB Churchill Cup
2006 IRB Pacific 5 Nations
2006 IRB Nations Cup
2006 France rugby union tour

References

External links
2006 Bundaberg Rum Rugby Series at Rugby.com.au
2006 All Blacks fixtures at AllBlacks.com
2006 Springboks fixtures at SARugby.co.za

2005
2006–07 in European rugby union
2005–06 in European rugby union
2006 in Oceanian rugby union
2006 in South American rugby union
2006 in South African rugby union
2005–06 in Japanese rugby union
Rugby tests